Liang Po Po: The Movie (梁婆婆重出江湖; literally Granny Liang/ Grandma Neo returns to the real world) is a Singaporean comedy film directed by Teng Bee Lian in 1999. It starred the comedian director Jack Neo himself, who cross-dresses as the titular old lady, which in English is translated as "Grandma Neo".

Synopsis
The main character, an 85-year-old lady named Liang Po Po, made a decision to leave her retirement home in search of a new life, with a belief that she can still contribute to society.

On her first day, she was robbed by female gangster Ah Lian and her comrades, and when Liang tried to work as a gas pump attendant, chaos ensued. Liang then met and befriended a couple of gangsters named Ah Beng and Ah Seng, and got involved in a secret society that is involved in crimes. Taking advantage of Liang's unsuspecting nature, the society used her to sell pirated VCDs, as well as debt collection.

As Liang develops a genuine friendship with Ah Beng and Ah Seng, the man who runs the secret society, known as Big Boss, decided that his gang should be respected, and enlisted the service of two Hong Kong triad consultants, in an effort to improve the image and profile of the gang. The consultants insisted that gang members should be dressed in suits and sunglasses, and the Big Boss even dreamt of himself getting involved in politics, as a way to exert greater influence on civil society.

To raise money for an election campaign, the consultants persuaded Big Boss to orchestrate a bank robbery. Liang was seen as an ideal person to carry out the robbery, because it was felt that no one will suspect an elderly person for a robbery, and if caught, Liang is expected to gain sympathy from authorities. The plan was discovered by Ah Beng and Ah Seng, who then tried to send Liang away. Liang, however, refused to leave her friends, she was determined to follow through with the mission, unaware of what it actually entails.

The robbery was successful, but the bank later reported a much bigger amount of money missing, thus sparking a nationwide hunt for Liang. Meanwhile, both the gangsters and authorities race against each other to find Liang, and recover the money first. As she goes on the run, Liang realized she was used by Big Boss and his consultants, and decided to go on a path to turn the table on those who mistreated her.

Production
This film was the first produced by Mediacorp Raintree Pictures, and was based on a character created and popularized by a Television Corporation of Singapore (now MediaCorp) television series.

On 21 September 1998, filming commenced at various locations in Singapore, including Bukit Merah Central, the Huang Shi Zong Hui (Huang Clan Association Building) in Geylang, 
and the abandoned Changi Commando Barracks.

Utilizing a crew of 50, this was the first Singaporean film to feature high-speed chases, as well as choreographed fight scenes involving hundreds of extras.

In an effort to broaden the film's appeal, well-known Hong Kong celebrities Eric Tsang and Sheren Tang, as well as Malaysian singer Ah Niu were cast in supporting, cameo roles.

Cast
Jack Neo as Liang Po Po/Liang Xi Mei
Mark Lee as Ah Beng
Henry Thia as Ah Seng
Patricia Mok as Ah Lian
John Cheng as Big Boss
 Ah Niu as gas pump attendant
 Eric Tsang and Sheren Tang as consultants from Hong Kong
In addition, Zoe Tay, Chen Liping, Evelyn Tan, Kym Ng, Robin Leong, and Chris Ho have cameos in the film.

References

External links
 Official website (Archived)
 

Mandarin-language films
1999 films
1990s parody films
Film spin-offs
1999 comedy films
Singaporean multilingual films
Triad films
1990s Hong Kong films